The Los Hermanos Archipelago is a chain of seven rocky barren islets that is part of the Federal Dependencies of Venezuela, at .

The individual islands are:

 Isla La Orquilla
 Islote El Rajao
 Isla Los Morochos
 Islote Papelón 
 Isla Grueso
 Isla Pico (Isla Pando)
 Isla Fondeadero
 Isla Chiquito

See also 
Federal Dependencies of Venezuela
List of marine molluscs of Venezuela
List of Poriferans of Venezuela

References 

Federal Dependencies of Venezuela
Venezuelan islands of the Leeward Antilles